Terry R. Scheetz (born December 10, 1941) is a former Republican member of the Pennsylvania House of Representatives.
 He was born in Lancaster.

References

Republican Party members of the Pennsylvania House of Representatives
Living people
1941 births